Georgia State Route 8 Connector may refer to:

 Georgia State Route 8 Connector (Danielsville): a former connector route of State Route 8 that partially existed in Danielsville
 Georgia State Route 8 Connector (Villa Rica): a connector route of State Route 8 that exists entirely within Villa Rica

008 Connector